is a Japanese manga artist from Katsushika, Tokyo. He is best known for his long-running comedy series KochiKame: Tokyo Beat Cops, which was continuously published in Weekly Shōnen Jump for 40 years from 1976 to 2016. With 1,960 chapters collected into 201 tankōbon volumes, it held the Guinness World Record for "Most volumes published for a single manga series" from September 2016 to July 2021. The series has sold over 155 million copies, making it one of the best-selling manga series in history. Akimoto has been creating the Western series Black Tiger since 2017.

Career
Before becoming a professional manga artist, Akimoto worked at the animation studio Tatsunoko Production on series such as Science Ninja Team Gatchaman. He changed to using his real name in 1978, after the series reached its 100th chapter. The manga was continuously serialized in Weekly Shōnen Jump for 40 years from 1976 to 2016 and has sold over 155 million copies, making it one of the best-selling manga series in history. On December 31, 2016, Shueisha reprinted the Weekly Shōnen Jump issue that included the final chapter of Kochikame, marking the first time the magazine has ever been reprinted. Kochikame has spawned a large media franchise that includes adaptations both animated and live-action; an anime television series, several animated films, a live-action film, live-action TV drama, and stage adaptations.

In 1985, Akimoto started the action comedy series Mr. Clice, which follows the Japanese secret agent Jin Clice, who has the body of a woman but the mind of a man. It was originally serialized in Monthly Shōnen Jump from 1985 to 2007, before being revived in Jump SQ. in 2017 and transferring to Jump SQ. Rise in 2018.

In November 2010, Akimoto was one of several manga artists that held a press conference in opposition to Tokyo Metropolitan Ordinance Regarding the Healthy Development of Youths's Bill 156. In February 2014, he drew the one-shot "Vocalo" which is set 50 years after the rise of Vocaloid technology and ran in the shōjo manga magazine Margaret. The following year, Grand Jump published his "Allie, Shoot Your Gun" Western one-shot in January 2015.

In addition to resuming Mr. Clice, Akimoto launched three new manga series in three different Shueisha magazines in 2017. The Western Black Tiger has been serialized in Grand Jump since the second issue of 2017, which was released in December 2016. Finder: Kyoto Jogakuin Monogatari was serialized in Weekly Young Jump from February 2017 until March 2018. It follows a group of four girls at an all-female high school in Kameoka, Kyoto. A "sequel" to Kochikame, Ii Yu da ne! ran in Ultra Jump from March 2017 to June 2019. Set in a bathhouse in Shitamachi, Gorō Kuma and his grandson are deeply moved when the Brazilian wife of Kuma's son arrives to save the bathhouse from having to close.

In 2019, Akimoto published Akimoto Osamu no Shigoto-jutsu, an instructional book that explains how he used schedule management to serialize a successful manga for 40 years.

Awards and accolades
In 2005, Kochikame was one of two winners of the Special Judges Award at the 50th Shogakukan Manga Awards in 2005.

With 200 tankōbon volumes, Akimoto and Kochikame held the Guinness World Record for "Most volumes published for a single manga series" from September 2016 to July 2021. Also in 2016, Akimoto received the 64th Kikuchi Kan Prize for creating Kochikame for 40 years without breaks. The following year, he received the Special Prize at the 21st Tezuka Osamu Cultural Prize for the series, and the Seiun Award for Best Comic.

In 2019, the Japanese government gave Akimoto the Medal with Purple Ribbon for his contributions to the arts.

Works
 
 Mr. Clice (1985–2007, 2017–present, serialized in Monthly Shōnen Jump, Jump SQ. and Jump SQ. Rise)
 
 "Vocalo" (2014, published in Margaret)
 
 Black Tiger (2016–present, serialized in Grand Jump)

Assistants
Hiroshi Aro
Naoki Azuma
Yoshihiro Kuroiwa
Usune Masatoshi
Shōgo Sakamoto
Chinatsu Tomizawa

References

External links
 

1952 births
Living people
Manga artists from Tokyo
Kochira Katsushika-ku Kameari Kōen-mae Hashutsujo
Winner of Tezuka Osamu Cultural Prize (Special Award)
Recipients of the Medal with Purple Ribbon